Sir George Arthur, 1st Baronet (1784–1854) was a colonial governor.

George Arthur may also refer to:
 George K. Arthur (1899–1985), Scottish-American film producer and actor
 George Arthur (Australian soccer) (born 1925), Australian football (soccer) player
 George Arthur (Ghanaian footballer) (1968–2015), Ghanaian football (soccer) player and coach
 George Arthur (cricketer) (1849–1932), Australian cricketer
 George Arthur, a fictional character in Tom Brown's School Days, a novel by Thomas Hughes
 Sir George Arthur, 3rd Baronet (1860–1946) of the Arthur baronets
 Sir George Arthur, 4th Baronet (1908–1949) of the Arthur baronets

See also